Osvaldo Eustasio Salas Freire (March 29, 1914 – May 5, 1992), was a Cuban-American photographer, remembered for his famous image of Ernest Hemingway and Fidel Castro in Cuba, circa 1960, and for his prolific documentation of American Major League Baseball—and, in particular, the influx of minority players—during the 1950s, all of which now resides in the collection of the National Baseball Hall of Fame.

Early life and career
Born in Havana, Cuba, Salas was the first of three children raised by Antonio Salas Martinez and Ramona Freyre.

Notable photos by Salas
 Sugar Ray Robinson with training bag (1953)
 Felix Montemayor, Roman Mejias and Roberto Clemente (May 30, 1955)
 Archie Moore and Rocky Marciano (1956)
 Baseball Friction in Cuba (1959)
 Ernest Hemingway with Fidel Castro after a Fishing Tournament, June 11, 1960 (1960)

Exhibitions
Group exhibitions of his works include: in 1967, Expo’67, Pabellón Cubano, Montreal; 1985, County Hall, London. 2000, Cuba, A Photographic Journey, The College of Santa Fe;

Collections
His works are in the collections of the National Baseball Hall of Fame and Museum, the Museum of Fine Arts, Houston,  the Smithsonian American Art Museum,  Casa de las Américas, Havana, Cuba; Center for Cuban Studies, New York, NY; Centro Studi e Archivio della Comunicazione, Parma University, Parma, Italy; Fototeca de Cuba, Havana, Cuba; Galleria IF, Milan, Italy; Galleria Il Diafragma Kodak, Milan, Italy; Maison de la Culture de la Seine Saint-Denis, Paris, France; Museo Nacional de Bellas Artes, Havana, Cuba.

References

Further reading

Articles
 Tweddle, Christine (January 25, 1992). "Man for All Seasons". The Independent Magazine. pp. 38, 40
 Munoz, Lorenza (January 28, 1999). "Putting a Human Face on Revolution". The Los Angeles Times Weekend Calendar. pp. 46, 48

Books
 Salas, Osvaldo; Salas, Roberto (1997). Ernesto Che Guevara: fotografias, 1960-1964. La Habana: Instituto Cubano del Libro. .
 Salas, Osvaldo; Salas, Roberto (1998). Fidel's Cuba: A Revolution in Pictures. New York: Thunder Mouth's Press. .

External links

Osvaldo Salas at National Baseball Hall of Fame
Osvaldo Salas at Artnet
Osvaldo Salas at Smithsonian American Art Museum
Osvaldo Salas at Artsy 
Roberto Salas Photography

1914 births
1992 deaths
Cuban emigrants to the United States
Cuban photographers
Cuban communists
Portrait photographers
Artists from Havana